Juan Sebastián Cabal and Robert Farah were the defending champions but Farah decided not to participate.
Cabal partners up with Alejandro Falla, losing in the first round.
Paul Capdeville and Nicolás Massú won the title, defeating Alessio di Mauro and Matteo Viola in the final.

Seeds

Draw

Draw

References
 Main Draw

Seguros Bolivar Open Medellin - Doubles
2011 Doubles